is a railway station in Kita-ku, Nagoya, Aichi Prefecture, Japan

This station provides access to Meijō Park.

Lines

 (Station number: M08)

Layout

Platforms

References

External links
 

Railway stations in Japan opened in 1971
Railway stations in Aichi Prefecture